Altenia elsneriella is a moth of the family Gelechiidae. It is found in Croatia, North Macedonia and Greece.

References

Moths described in 1999
Altenia
Moths of Europe